The Amur bitterling (Rhodeus sericeus) is a small fish of the carp family. It is sometimes just called "bitterling", which dates back to the time when the European bitterling (Rhodeus amarus) was still considered conspecific with R. sericeus, and "bitterling" properly refers to any species in entire genus Rhodeus. The Amur bitterling is found in Siberia, while the European bitterling is found from European Russia westwards.

Mussels form an essential part of its reproductive system, with bitterling eggs being laid inside them. Long thought to be symbiotic with the mussels (whose larval phase attaches to fish gills during development), recent research has indicated they are in fact parasitic, with co-evolution being seen in Chinese bitterling and mussel species.

Bitterlings usually reside in areas with dense plant growth. They are hardy fish, and can survive in water that is not very well oxygenated. They grow to be 3-4 in long at most. The bitterling's diet consists of plant material and small larvae of insects.

Colour variation 
Transparent scale variants of bitterlings occur, though not commonly, and are exploited in the aquarium trade.

References

Rhodeus
Fish described in 1776